Pleszew railway station is a railway station in Kowalew, Greater Poland Voivodeship, Poland, 4 km West of Centre of Pleszew. The station is located on the  Kluczbork–Poznań railway. The train services are operated by Przewozy Regionalne.

Train services
The station is served by the following service(s):

Intercity services (IC) Poznań - Ostrów Wielkopolski - Kępno - Lubliniec - Częstochowa - Kraków 
Intercity services (TLK) Poznań - Ostrów Wielkopolski - Kępno - Lubliniec - Częstochowa - Kraków 
 InterRegio services (IR) Poznań Główny — Ostrów Wielkopolski — Łódź — Warszawa Główna
 Regional services (PR) Łódź Kaliska — Ostrów Wielkopolski — Poznań Główny

References

Railway stations in Greater Poland Voivodeship
Railway stations served by Przewozy Regionalne InterRegio
Railway stations in Poland opened in 1875